FIDC may refer to:

 Falkland Islands Development Corporation, Falkland Islands quasi-autonomous government agency
 Fundo de Investimento em Direitos Creditórios, Brazilian financial instrument